The saltmarsh sparrow (Ammospiza caudacuta) is a small New World sparrow found in salt marshes along the Atlantic coast of the United States. At one time, this bird and the Nelson's sparrow (Ammospiza nelsoni) were thought to be a single species, the sharp-tailed sparrow. Because of this, the species was briefly known as the "saltmarsh sharp-tailed sparrow." Saltmarsh sparrow numbers are declining due to habitat loss largely attributed to human activity.

Description 
Adults have brownish upperparts with a gray nape, white throat and belly, and pale orange breast and sides with brown streaking. The face is orange with gray cheeks, a gray median crown stripe, brown lateral crown stripes, and a brown eyeline. The tail feathers are short and sharply pointed.

Distinguishing this species from closely related sparrows such as the Nelson's sparrow (Ammospiza nelsoni) can be difficult. The inland subspecies of the Nelson's sparrow can be differentiated by its fainter streaking and brighter orange breast and sides, while the coastal subspecies of the Nelson's sparrow can be differentiated by its paler, less-contrasting plumage. The saltmarsh sparrow also has a slightly longer beak than the Nelson's sparrow.

Taxonomy 
The species name caudacuta is Latin for "sharp-tailed." Its closest relatives are the Nelson's sparrow and the seaside sparrow (Ammospiza maritima).

The saltmarsh sparrow and the Nelson's sparrow were once thought to be a single species, called the sharp-tailed sparrow. Mitochondrial DNA evidence suggests that the two species diverged about 600,000 years ago. A Pleistocene glaciation is thought to have separated the ancestral sharp-tailed sparrow into inland and coastal populations. The inland Nelson's sparrow became a specialist of non-tidal freshwater wetlands while the coastal saltmarsh sparrow became a specialist of tidal salt marshes. Recently, the Nelson's sparrow has expanded its range to include coastal salt marshes, and interbreeding occurs where the two species overlap.

The saltmarsh sparrow is divided into two subspecies. The northern subspecies, A. caudacuta caudacuta, breeds from Maine to New Jersey, while the southern subspecies, A. caudacuta diversa, breeds in Maryland and Virginia. A. c. diversa has more contrasting striping on its back and a darker crown than A. c. caudacuta.

Habitat and distribution 
The saltmarsh sparrow is only found in tidal salt marshes along the Atlantic coast of the United States. It breeds along the northern coast, from Maine to the Chesapeake Bay, and winters along the southern coast, from North Carolina to Florida. The saltmarsh sparrow prefers high marsh habitat, dominated by saltmeadow cordgrass (Spartina patens) and saltmarsh rush (Juncus gerardii), which does not flood as frequently as low marsh.

Behavior

Vocalizations 
Only males sing. The song is a complex series of raspy, barely audible buzzes, trills, and gurgles. It is distinguishable from that of the Nelson's sparrow, which is a louder, hissing buzz followed by a buzzy chip. The high-pitched contact calls of both species are indistinguishable.

Diet 
The saltmarsh sparrow forages on the ground along tidal channels or in marsh vegetation, sometimes probing in the mud at low tide. Over 80% of its diet consists of flies, amphipods, grasshoppers, and moths, especially larval, pupal, and adult soldier flies. During the winter, it also eats seeds. The saltmarsh sparrow is an opportunistic feeder and food is rarely limiting.

Reproduction 

Saltmarsh sparrows are non-territorial and have large overlapping home ranges. Male home ranges are twice as large as those of females and may span .

Saltmarsh sparrows are promiscuous, and the majority of broods exhibit mixed parentage. During the nesting season, males roam long distances chasing and mounting females regardless of receptivity. Only females exhibit parental care, building the nest, incubating the eggs, and providing food to the young. Clutch size is 3 to 5. Incubation begins after the last egg is laid and takes 11–12 days. Young fledge 8–11 days after hatching but remain dependent on the mother for an additional 15–20 days.

The primary cause of nest mortality is flooding due to storm surges and periodic, exceptionally high spring tides which occur every 28 days during the new moon. The saltmarsh sparrow exhibits several adaptations to flooding, including nest repair, egg retrieval, rapid re-nesting, and synchronization of breeding with the lunar cycle. Nesting begins immediately following a spring tide, allowing young to fledge before the next spring tide. Two broods are typically raised per breeding season.

Conservation status 
The saltmarsh sparrow is of high conservation concern due to habitat loss resulting in small fragmented populations. Salt marshes are one of the most threatened habitats worldwide due to their limited natural extent, long history of human modification, and anticipated sea level rise. The spread of the invasive reed Phragmites has also contributed to habitat loss. The saltmarsh sparrow is very sensitive to sea level rise because of the role of flooding in nest mortality. In addition, the saltmarsh sparrow is particularly susceptible to mercury bioaccumulation, but the effects of this on survival are unclear.

Saltmarsh sparrow populations declined between 5% and 9% per year between the 1990s and 2010s, resulting in a total decline of over 75%. Without management intervention, the saltmarsh sparrow is projected to become extinct by 2050. The saltmarsh sparrow was listed on the 2016 State of North America's Birds Watch List with a concern score of 19 out of 20, and the U.S. Fish and Wildlife Service is currently undertaking a status review to determine whether the species should be listed under the Endangered Species Act. Its total population was estimated to be 53,000 in 2016.

References

Further reading

Book
 Greenlaw, J. S. and J. D. Rising. 1994. Sharp-tailed Sparrow (Ammodramus caudacutus). In The Birds of North America, No. 112 (A. Poole and F. Gill, Eds.). Philadelphia: The Academy of Natural Sciences; Washington, D.C.: The American Ornithologists’ Union.

Articles
 Benoit LK & Askins RA. (2002). Relationship between habitat area and the distribution of tidal marsh birds. Wilson Bulletin. vol 114, no 3. p. 314-323.
 Chan YL, Hill CE, Maldonado JE & Fleischer RC. (2006). Evolution and conservation of tidal-marsh vertebrates: Molecular approaches. Studies in Avian Biology. vol 32, p. 54-75.
 Conway CJ & Droege S. (2006). A unified strategy for monitoring changes in abundance of birds associated with North American tidal marshes. Studies in Avian Biology. vol 32, p. 282-297.
 DiQuinzio DA, Paton PWC & Eddleman WR. (2002). Nesting ecology of saltmarsh sharp-tailed sparrows in a tidally restricted salt marsh. Wetlands. vol 22, no 1. p. 179-185.
 Erwin RM, Cahoon DR, Prosser DJ, Sanders GM & Hensel P. (2006). Surface elevation dynamics in vegetated Spartina marshes versus unvegetated tidal ponds along the mid-Atlantic coast, USA, with implications to waterbirds. Estuaries & Coasts. vol 29, no 1. p. 96-106.
 Erwin RM, Sanders GM & Prosser DJ. (2004). Changes in lagoonal marsh morphology at selected northeastern Atlantic coast sites of significance to migratory waterbirds. Wetlands. vol 24, no 4. p. 891-903.
 Erwin RM, Sanders GM, Prosser DJ & Cahoon DR. (2006). High tides and rising seas: Potential effects on estuarine waterbirds. Studies in Avian Biology. vol 32, p. 214-228.
 Fry AJ. (1999). Mildly deleterious mutations in avian mitochondrial DNA: Evidence from neutrality tests. Evolution. vol 53, no 5. p. 1617-1620.
 Grenier JL & Greenberg R. (2006). Trophic adaptations in sparrows and other vertebrates of tidal marshes. Studies in Avian Biology. vol 32, p. 130-139.
 Hanowski JM & Niemi GJ. (1990). "An Approach for Quantifying Habitat Characteristics for Rare Wetland Birds". In Mitchell, R S, C J Sheviak and D J Leopold (Ed) New York State Museum Bulletin, No 471 Ecosystem Management: Rare Species and Significant Habitats; 15th Annual Natural Areas Conference and 10th Annual Meeting of the Natural Areas Association, Syracuse, New York, USA, June 6–9, 1988 Ix+314p New York State Museum: Albany, New York, USA Illus Maps Paper 51–56, 1990.
 Hodgman TP, Shriver WG & Vickery PD. (2002). Redefining range overlap between the Sharp-tailed Sparrows of coastal New England. Wilson Bulletin. vol 114, no 1. p. 38-43.
 Patten MA & Radamaker K. (1991). A Fall Record of the Sharp-Tailed Sparrow for Interior California USA. Western Birds. vol 22, no 1. p. 37-38.
 Post W. (1998). The status of Nelson's and saltmarsh sharp-tailed sparrows on Waccasassa Bay, Levy County, Florida. Florida Field Naturalist. vol 26, no 1. p. 1-6.

External links
 A photo-essay at North American Birds
 Audubon News: Saving the Saltmarsh Sparrow

saltmarsh sparrow
saltmarsh sparrow
Native birds of the Northeastern United States
Endemic birds of the Eastern United States
saltmarsh sparrow
saltmarsh sparrow